New Earth Time (or NET) is an alternative naming system for measuring the time of day proposed in 1999. In NET the day is split into 360 NET degrees, each NET degree is split into 60 NET minutes and each NET minute is split into 60 NET seconds. One NET degree is therefore equivalent to four standard minutes, and one standard hour is equivalent to 15 NET degrees.

NET is equivalent to the UTC read from a 24-hour analog clock as the clockwise angle past midnight of the hour hand. For example, noon is  NET and at that time the hour hand is pointing straight down forming a 180° angle when measured from the top, at midnight. A full circle is 360 degrees and one NET day.

History
New Earth Time was invented on 15 September 1999 by Mark Laugesen from Auckland, New Zealand. The rights to the name New Earth Time (or NET) and slogan "360 degrees of time" are novel and owned by degree NET Ltd. Similar ideas for unifying time measurement across the globe include Swatch Internet Time, another rebranding of UTC+1.

See also
 24-hour analog dial
 Decimal time
 Rebranding
 Swatch Internet Time
 UTC

Further reading

External links
 

1999 works
Time measurement systems